Joseph Gaynor Cawley (June 19, 1941 – March 12, 2021) was a Democratic member of the Pennsylvania House of Representatives and professional baseball player.

Born in Scranton, Pennsylvania, he played minor league baseball for Detroit. He was store manager at a Woolworth store in Wilkes-Barre. He was a 1960 graduate of St. Patrick's High School and attended University of Scranton.

He served the city of Scranton, Pennsylvania, in various capacities, including director of public works from 1978 to 1979, deputy mayor from 1977 through 1980, and director of community development in 1980. He was elected to represent the 113th legislative district in the Pennsylvania House of Representatives in 1980. He retired prior to the 2006 election.

Early life
Cawley was born on June 19, 1941, in the city of Scranton in Lackawanna County, Pennsylvania. He was raised in a Roman Catholic family in the Westside neighborhood of Scranton. His father, Joseph Gaynor Cawley (1915–1973), was of Irish descent; he worked as a steelworker. His mother, Margaret McHale (1917–2009), was of Irish and Welsh descent. They had a total of five children: Patrick, Sarah, Gaynor, Linda and James.

Cawley attended high school at Saint Patrick's in West Scranton and graduated in 1960. He then attended the University of Scranton but withdrew after two years to sign a ProBaseball contract.

State representative

References

External links
 official PA House profile (archived)
 official Party website (archived)

1941 births
2021 deaths
Politicians from Scranton, Pennsylvania
Sportspeople from Scranton, Pennsylvania
Baseball players from Pennsylvania
University of Scranton alumni
Democratic Party members of the Pennsylvania House of Representatives
American people of Irish descent
American people of Welsh descent